Durga Sohay is a Bengali family drama cum thriller film directed by Arindam Sil and produced by Avishek Ghosh. This film was released on 28 April 2017. The music is released by Amara Muzik.

Plot 
The story revolves with the incidents of a Banedi jewellers family in the period between Mahalaya and Vijayadashami. Durga, an young lady enters into the house of wealthy Basak family in North Kolkata as a nurse to take care of the eldest person. She turns out to be a thief, caught by the compassionate lady Manasi. Manasi convinces others to give her a second chance. Gradually Durga takes all the member in confidence and become as good as a family member. Actually she joins in the house as a servant according to the plan of her husband Madhab who is a dacoit. Madhab and his goons plan to raid the house in the night of Dashami., but fail when Durga informs the police beforehand. After the decoit team is caught, police take in Durga as well. Because Durga is actually Chaina who was the informer of the said decoits and was guilty for three thefts. But Basak family, promises Durga to help her and welcome her back when she is free. The film ends with the departure of Maa Durga and Durga/Chaina, with the hope that both of them will come back to their homes when it is time.

Cast 
 Sohini Sarkar as Durga/Chaina
 Kaushik Sen as Dibyendu
 Tanusree Chakraborty as Manasi
 Debjani Chattopadhyay as Smita
 Sampurna Lahiri as Panni
 Indrasish Roy as Shuvo
 Sumanta Mukherjee as Dadu, Head of family
 Rwitobroto Mukherjee as Bhrigu
 Anusha Vishwanathan as Bhrigu's friend
 Sean Banerjee as Hiranya
 Anirban Bhattacharya as Madhab/ Durga's husband in a Guest appearance

References

External links
 

2017 films
Films set in Kolkata
Films directed by Arindam Sil
Films scored by Bickram Ghosh
Indian drama films
Bengali-language Indian films
2010s Bengali-language films